Local elections in Botswana were held on 30 October 2004 for the district councils of the Districts of Botswana.

Overall Results

Results By District

Central District

The election in one ward was postponed due to the death of a candidate. The Botswana Democratic Party (BDP) won the seat in a by-election held on 4 December 2004, bringing their total to 128 seats.

Francistown City

Elections in one ward were postponed because the party symbol for one of the contestants was erroneously omitted. The Botswana People's Party (BPP) won the seat in a by-election held on 4 December 2004, giving it one seat.

Gaborone City

Ghanzi District

Jwaneng

Kgalagadi District

Kgatleng District

Kweneng District

Lobatse

North-East District

North-West District

Selibe Phikwe

South-East District

Southern District

There was a tie in one constituency and a by-election was held on 8 January 2005. The Botswana National Front (BNF) candidate won, bringing their total to 24 seats.

2004 elections in Africa
2004 in Botswana
Local elections in Botswana
October 2004 events in Africa